Darly Zoqbi de Paula (born 25 August 1982) is a Brazilian-born Spanish handball goalkeeper for Gloria Bistrița and the Spanish national team.

She participated at the 2004 Summer Olympics in Athens, at the 2008 Summer Olympics in China and at the 2016 Summer Olympics in Brazil.

International honours 
EHF Champions League: 
Fourth place: 2017
EHF Cup Winners' Cup: 
Finalist: 2015
EHF Cup: 
Semifinalist: 2010

Individual awards
Junior World Championship Best Goalkeeper: 2001
French Championship Best Goalkeeper: 2015

References

External links

1982 births
Living people
Brazilian female handball players
Spanish female handball players
Handball players at the 2004 Summer Olympics
Handball players at the 2008 Summer Olympics
Handball players at the 2016 Summer Olympics
Olympic handball players of Brazil
Olympic handball players of Spain
Expatriate handball players
Brazilian expatriate sportspeople in Spain
Brazilian expatriate sportspeople in France
Spanish expatriate sportspeople in France
Spanish expatriate sportspeople in Montenegro
Spanish expatriate sportspeople in Romania
Handball players at the 2003 Pan American Games
Handball players at the 2007 Pan American Games
Pan American Games medalists in handball
Pan American Games gold medalists for Brazil
Medalists at the 2007 Pan American Games
Sportspeople from Minas Gerais
Naturalised citizens of Spain
Brazilian expatriate sportspeople in Romania
Brazilian expatriate sportspeople in Montenegro